The SADF Champion Shot Medal is a military medal which was instituted by the Republic of South Africa in 1975. It was awarded to the champion shots of the annual South African Defence Force Shooting Championships in the categories of full-bore, small-bore, service shooting and pistol. The medal could be won multiple times, with each subsequent award indicated by a bar.

Institution
The SADF Champion Shot Medal, which replaced the Commandant General's Medal, was instituted by the State President by Warrant dated 1 October 1975, published in Government Gazette no. 4874 dated  17 October 1975.

Award criteria
From 1976, four medals were awarded annually to the champion shots of the South African Defence Force Shooting Championships in the categories of full-bore, small-bore, service shooting and pistol respectively. The medal could be won multiple times and each subsequent award was indicated by the addition of a Bar. Champions who had already been awarded the defunct Commandant General's Medal were awarded Bars to add to their existing medal.

Order of wear

The position of the SADF Champion Shot Medal in the official order of precedence was revised three times after 1975, to accommodate the inclusion or institution of new decorations and medals, first upon the integration into the South African National Defence Force on 27 April 1994, again in April 1996 when decorations and medals were belatedly instituted for the two former non-statutory forces, the Azanian People's Liberation Army and Umkhonto we Sizwe, and again upon the institution of a new set of awards on 27 April 2003, but it remained unchanged on all three occasions.

  
Official SANDF order of precedence
 Preceded by the Commandant General's Medal of the Republic of South Africa.
 Succeeded by the National Cadet Bisley Grand Champion Medal of the Republic of South Africa.

Official national order of precedence
 Preceded by the Commandant General's Medal of the Republic of South Africa.
 Succeeded by the National Cadet Bisley Grand Champion Medal of the Republic of South Africa.

Description
Obverse
The SADF Champion Shot Medal is a medallion struck in silver, 3 millimetres thick at the centre and 38 millimetres in diameter, depicting the five-pointed outline of the Castle of Good Hope, with a laurel between the two points at the bottom and proteas between the others. A roundel in the centre has two crossed rifles over a shooting target, with a shooting range in the background. It is inscribed "SAW KAMPIOENSKUT-MEDALJE" and "SADF CHAMPION SHOT MEDAL" below the target, each language in two lines. The suspender is decorated with protea leaves.

Reverse
The reverse has the pre-1994 South African Coat of Arms and the medal number is impressed at the bottom of the medal on the rim.

Ribbon
The ribbon is the same as for the Commandant General's Medal, 32 millimetres wide, with a 6 millimetres wide light blue band and a 7 millimetres wide dark orange band, repeated in reverse order and separated by a 6 millimetres wide navy blue band in the centre. Dark orange, light blue and navy blue are the colours of the three Arms of the Service, the South African Army, the South African Air Force and the South African Navy.

Bar
The Bar is of silver and has a shooting target embossed in the centre. When ribbons alone are worn, separate circular buttons are worn on the ribbon bar to denote each subsequent award of the medal.

Discontinuation
Conferment of the medal was discontinued in respect of championships on or after 27 April 2003. No new medal was instituted to replace it.

Recipients
The champions from 1976 to 1986 are listed in the table. An award of a bar to a recipient of the defunct Commandant General's Medal is denoted by "(CGM)" after his surname.

References

Military decorations and medals of South Africa
1975 establishments in South Africa
Awards established in 1975